Sylvester & Tweety: Breakfast on the Run, known as Looney Tunes: Twouble! in North America, is a 2D and isometric, pseudo-3D platform video game developed by Bit Managers and published by Infogrames for the Game Boy Color in 1998. It features the Looney Tunes characters Sylvester and Tweety. Other Looney Tunes include Bugs Bunny, Daffy Duck, Granny, Hector the Bulldog and Taz.

Gameplay
The player controls Sylvester and navigates him through 5 levels, which are divided into 2 parts (2D Mode and 3D Mode). Sylvester tries to capture Tweety while avoiding enemies and obstacles. Key items can be stored in the inventory and combined to make a helpful, new item if the player has the right combination. A password system is used to save progress.

Reception
IGN gave it a rating of 5/10. Los Angeles Times remarked “an adventure-style game that lacks almost any redeeming quality.”

References

External links
 
 Sylvester & Tweety: Breakfast on the Run at GameFAQs

1998 video games
Platform games
Game Boy games
Game Boy Color games
Single-player video games
Video games with isometric graphics
Video games featuring Bugs Bunny
Video games featuring Daffy Duck
Video games featuring Sylvester the Cat
Video games featuring the Tasmanian Devil (Looney Tunes)
Video games about birds
Video games developed in Spain
Video games scored by Alberto Jose González
Cartoon Network video games